Wayne Black and Sandon Stolle were the defending champions, but did not partner together this year.  Black partnered Andrew Kratzmann, losing in the second round.  Stolle partnered Paul Haarhuis, losing in the quarterfinals.

Todd Woodbridge and Mark Woodforde won the title, defeating Martin Damm and Dominik Hrbatý 6–3, 6–4 in the final.

Seeds

  Alex O'Brien /  Jared Palmer (semifinals)
  Ellis Ferreira /  Rick Leach (third round)
  Todd Woodbridge /  Mark Woodforde (champions)
  Paul Haarhuis /  Sandon Stolle (quarterfinals)
  Jonas Björkman /  Byron Black (quarterfinals)
  Wayne Arthurs /  Leander Paes (second round)
  David Adams /  John-Laffnie de Jager (third round)
  Justin Gimelstob /  Sébastien Lareau (quarterfinals)
  Wayne Black /  Andrew Kratzmann (second round)
  Jiří Novák /  David Rikl (quarterfinals)
  Olivier Delaître /  Fabrice Santoro (second round)
  Mark Knowles /  Max Mirnyi (second round)
  Piet Norval /  Kevin Ullyett (third round)
  David Macpherson /  Jeff Tarango (second round)
  David Prinosil /  Mikael Tillström (second round)
  Wayne Ferreira /  Yevgeny Kafelnikov (second round)

Draw

Finals

Top half

Section 1

Section 2

Bottom half

Section 3

Section 4

References

 Main Draw

Men's Doubles
2000 ATP Tour